Where Is the Friend's House? (Khane-ye dust kojast) is a 1987 Iranian drama film written and directed by Abbas Kiarostami. It depicts a conscientious schoolboy's attempt to return his friend's school notebook to his home in a neighboring village, to prevent the friend from being expelled if he fails to hand it in the next day. The title derives from a poem by Sohrab Sepehri. The film is the first installment in Kiarostami's Koker trilogy, followed by And Life Goes On and Through the Olive Trees, all of which take place in Koker, Iran.

Plot
As the film opens Ahmad (Babak Ahmadpour), a grade schooler, watches as his teacher (Khodabakhsh Defai) berates a fellow student, Mohammad Reza, for repeatedly failing to use his notebook for his homework, threatening expulsion on the next offense. When Ahmad returns home, he realizes he's accidentally taken Mohammad Reza's notebook. Against his mother's orders, he sets out in search for Mohammad Reza's house, encountering false leads, dead ends, and distractions as he attempts to enlist adults in his search, most of whom ignore him or cannot answer his questions. When night falls and he has been unable to find his friend's house, Ahmad goes home and does the homework for his friend. The next day the homework is deemed excellent by the teacher.

Cast
 Babak Ahmadpour as Ahmad Ahmadpour
 Ahmed Ahmadpour as Mohammad Reza Nematzadeh
 Khodabaksh Defai as the Teacher
 Iran Outari as Mother 
 Ayat Ansari as Father
 Sadika Tohidi as the Persian Neighbour
 Biman Mouafi as Ali, a neighbour
 Ali Jamali as Grandfather's Friend
 Aziz Babai as the Waiter
 Nader Gholami as the Property Owner
 Akbar Moradi as the Old Man from Azerbaijan
 Teba Solimani as the Husband
 Mohammad Reza Parvaneh as the Man Mistaken for Ali 
 Farahanka Brothers as the Young Boy
 Maria Chdjari as the Girl who Stutters
 Hamdollah Askarpour as the Old Man
 Kadiret Kaoiyenpour as the Religious Old Man
 Hajar Farazpour as the Apple Seller
 Mohammad Hossein Rouhi as the Carpenter
 Rafia Difai as Grandfather
 Agakhan Karadach Khani as the Street Vendor

Commendations
Where Is the Friend's House? was Kiarostami's first film to gain major international attention. It won the Bronze Leopard at the 1989 Locarno Film Festival, and the Golden Plate at the Fajr Film Festival. The film is on the British Film Institute's list of 50 films to see by age 15.

Legacy
Iranian filmmaker Bahman Ghobadi said that "I always have this film in mind because of the director's profound perspective on filmmaking and its strange and distinct structure".

The Japanese filmmaker Akira Kurosawa cited Where is the Friend's House? as one of his favorite films.

Jonathan Rosenbaum in 2015 called Kiarostami the greatest living filmmaker and called the film (along with Through the Olive Trees and And Life Goes On) "sustained meditations on singular landscapes and the way ordinary people live in them; obsessional quests that take on the contours of parables; concentrated inquiries that raise more questions than they answer; and comic as well as cosmic poems about dealing with personal and impersonal disaster. They're about making discoveries and cherishing what's in the world--including things that we can't understand".

References

External links
 
 
 

1987 films
1987 drama films
Iranian drama films
1980s Persian-language films
Films about children
Films directed by Abbas Kiarostami
Films set in Iran
Films whose director won the Best Directing Crystal Simorgh